is a Japanese actor, stage actor and musician from Matsudo, Chiba Prefecture. He started his acting career after joining a theater company/talent agency, Otona Keikaku, in around 1992 and gained his popularity after the drama series Team Medical Dragon and as being the lead singer of the Japanese comedy rock band Group Tamashii.   His stage name is a pun on notorious geisha Sada Abe.

Abe was nominated for best actor in the 31st Japanese Academy Award for Maiko Haaaan!!!.

Discography

Filmography

Film 
Naked Blood (1995) as Eiji Kure
Tokiwa: The Manga Apartment (1996) as Hiroshi Fujimoto
After Life (1998)
Uzumaki (2000) as Mitsuru Yamaguchi
Kamikaze Girls (2004) as Ryuji 'the Unicorn'/Doctor
The Great Yokai War (2005) 
Yaji and Kita: The Midnight Pilgrims (2005)
Helen the Baby Fox (2006) as police officer
Ten Nights of Dream (segment - The 6th Night) (2006)
Kisarazu Cat's Eye: World Series (2006) as Kaoru Nekota
Maiko Haaaan!!! (2007) as Kimihiko Onizuka
Paco and the Magical Picture Book (2008) as Horigome
Yatterman (2009) as Dr. Kaieda
Friends: Mononoke Shima no Naki (2011) as Gōyan (voice)
Gothic Lolita Battle Bear (2013) as teddy bear (voice)
Parasyte: Part 1 (2014) as Migi (voice)
Parasyte: Part 2 (2015) as Migi (voice)
The Magnificent Nine (2016) as Juzaburo Kokudaya
Birds Without Names (2017) as Jinji
Louder!: Can't Hear What You're Singin', Wimp (2018) as Shin
The 47 Ronin in Debt (2019) as Asano "Takumi no Kami" Naganori
Mother (2020) as Ryo
Lesson in Murder (2022) as Yamato Haimura
I Am Makimoto (2022), Sō Makimoto
Shylock's Children (2023) as Masahiro Nishiki
Revolver Lily (2023)

Television 
Bayside Shakedown (1997) as Saeki
Ikebukuro West Gate Park (2000) as Hamaguchi
Summer Snow (2000)
Kisarazu Cat's Eye (2002) as Kaoru Nekota
Tiger & Dragon (2005) as Hayashiyatei Donta
Unfair (2006) as Kokubo Yuji
Dare Yorimo Mama wo Ai su (2006) as Pinko
Team Medical Dragon (2006) as Monji Arase
First Kiss (2007) as Masaru Nikaido
Team Medical Dragon 2 (2007) as Monji Arase
Fumō Chitai (2009) as Hideo Tahara
Marumo no Okite (2011) as Mamoru Takagi (Marumo)
Taira no Kiyomori (2012) as Shinzei
Keisei Saimin no Otoko Part 2 (2015) as Ichizō Kobayashi
Naotora: The Lady Warlord (2017) as Tokugawa Ieyasu
Anone (2018) as Kaji Mochimoto
Idaten (2019) as Masaji Tabata
Taiga Drama ga Umareta Hi (2023) - Kinji Kusuda

References

External links

Unofficial Sadao Abe homepage 

1970 births
Japanese male television actors
Japanese male stage actors
Japanese male film actors
Living people
People from Matsudo
20th-century Japanese male actors
21st-century Japanese male actors
Taiga drama lead actors